Brianna Throssell  (born 10 February 1996) is an Australian professional swimmer currently representing DC Trident at the International Swimming League.

Throssell competed in the 2014 Summer Youth Olympics, where she won seven bronze medals. She represented her country at the 2016 Summer Olympics in Rio de Janeiro where she finished third in the semi-finals with a time of 2:07:19 behind Zhou Yilin and Zhang Yufei. She qualified for the final and finished last with a time of 2:07:87.

Throssell again represented Australia at the 2020 Summer Olympics, held in Tokyo in 2021, where she swam in the 100m and 200m butterfly events, coming in 8th place in the final of the 200m event. She won a gold medal in the Women's 4 x 100 metre medley relay and a bronze medal in the Mixed 4 x 100 metre medley relay after swimming the butterfly leg in the heats for both events. She also won a bronze medal in the Women's 4 x 200 metre freestyle relay after swimming in the heats of that event.

In the 2022 Australia Day Honours Throssell was awarded the Medal of the Order of Australia.

World records

Long course metres

 split 1:55.60 (3rd leg); with Ariarne Titmus (1st leg), Madison Wilson (2nd leg), Emma McKeon (4th leg)

References

External links
 
 
 
 
 
 

1996 births
Australian female freestyle swimmers
Living people
Olympic swimmers of Australia
Recipients of the Medal of the Order of Australia
Swimmers from Perth, Western Australia
Swimmers at the 2014 Summer Youth Olympics
Swimmers at the 2016 Summer Olympics
Swimmers at the 2020 Summer Olympics
World Aquatics Championships medalists in swimming
Commonwealth Games medallists in swimming
Commonwealth Games gold medallists for Australia
Commonwealth Games bronze medallists for Australia
Swimmers at the 2018 Commonwealth Games
World record setters in swimming
Medalists at the 2020 Summer Olympics
Olympic gold medalists for Australia
Olympic gold medalists in swimming
20th-century Australian women
21st-century Australian women
Swimmers at the 2022 Commonwealth Games
Commonwealth Games competitors for Australia
Medallists at the 2018 Commonwealth Games
Medallists at the 2022 Commonwealth Games